This is a list of plateau and plateau-like landforms in British Columbia, Canada.